Fire and Glory is the third studio album by Canadian rapper Kardinal Offishall, released November 15, 2005 on EMI/Virgin Records, exclusively in Canada. Two hit singles were released from the album, "Everyday (Rudebwoy)" and "Feel Alright".

Background
In 2003, Kardinal released "Belly Dancer", featuring Pharrell Williams, which was originally the lead single from his album Firestarter Vol. 2: The F-Word Theory. The album was scheduled for a summer 2003 release on MCA Records, and was supposed to be his big-budget commercial breakthrough. However, the album was delayed numerous times, and MCA was absorbed by Geffen Records in May. Kardinal lost his chance to release the album, and it was shelved.

Fire and Glory, the follow-up to Quest for Fire: Firestarter, Vol. 1, featured collaborations with popular artists, such as Busta Rhymes, Vybz Kartel and Estelle. Three songs from the album — "Whatchalike", "All the Way" and "Mr. Officer" — were supposed to appear on the Firestarter Vol. 2 album. The album produced three singles and music videos in Canada: "Heads Up", "Feel Alright" and "Everyday (Rudebwoy)", the latter receiving heavy rotation on MuchMusic. In June 2006, Kardinal won three MuchMusic Video Awards for "Everyday (Rudebwoy)". A remix of the song "Last Standing Soldier" was released as a single in 2006, featuring Bedouin Soundclash.

Kardinal explained why he chose Fire and Glory as the name of the album:

Reception

RapReviews.com gave the album an 8.5/10 rating, stating "Fire and Glory is a better album than Firestarter Vol. 1," and "aside from having better lyrics than most of his counterparts, Kardinal's unique style also sets him apart." The album was nominated for Rap Recording of the Year at the 2006 Juno Awards.

Track listing

Samples
"Everyday (Rudebwoy)" – Contains a sample of "People Everyday" (metamorphosis mix) by Arrested Development
"Neva New (Till I Kissed You)" – Contains a sample of "Till I Kiss You" by Nana McLean
"Mr. Officer" – Contains a sample of "Chant a Psalm" by Steel Pulse

Personnel
Allistair – vocals  
Jully Black – vocals  
Craig Boyko – photography  
Busta Rhymes – lyricist, guest appearance  
Theodore Daley – cover art concept  
Exile – producer, instrumentation  
Kardinal Offishall – piano, vocals, producer, liner notes, executive producer, shaker, A&R, instrumentation  
Anne Keenan – photography  
Russ Klyne – guitar  
Mayday – executive producer, A&R  
Mr. Attic – producer, instrumentation  
Antoine Moonen – package design  
Memmalatel "Mr. Mojo" Morgan – executive producer, A&R  
Nicole Moses – vocals, lyricist  
Renee Neufville – vocals, lyricist  
Darryl Riley – vocals  
Ivana Santilli – horn  
Silver (Solitair) – executive producer, A&R

References

External links
Album credits at Discogs

2005 albums
Albums produced by Exile (producer)
Albums produced by Jake One
Albums produced by Kardinal Offishall
EMI Records albums
Kardinal Offishall albums
Virgin Records albums